This is a list of WWE NXT special episodes, detailing all professional wrestling television special cards promoted on NXT by WWE.

Special episodes

See also

List of WWE pay-per-view and WWE Network events
Wednesday Night Wars

References

External links

Special episodes
NXT special episodes